Jarrad Kennedy (born 27 February 1989) is an Australian professional rugby league footballer who plays for the Mount Pritchard Mounties in the Intrust Super Premiership. He previously played for the Canberra Raiders and the Manly-Warringah Sea Eagles in the National Rugby League.

Background
Born in Moruya, New South Wales, Kennedy played his junior rugby league for the Tuross Lakers and Moruya-Tuross Sharks, before being signed by the Canberra Raiders.

Playing career

Early career
In 2008 and 2009, Kennedy played for the Canberra Raiders'  NYC team. On 5 October 2008, Kennedy scored the match winning try in the Raiders' golden-point extra time win over the Brisbane Broncos in the 2008 NYC Grand Final. In 2010, he graduated on to the Raiders' Queensland Cup team, Souths Logan Magpies.

2012
In round 6 of the 2012 NRL season, Kennedy made his NRL debut for Canberra against the New Zealand Warriors.

2013
On 17 May, Kennedy re-signed with Canberra on a two-year contract.

2014
In round 11 of the 2014 NRL season, Kennedy scored his first NRL career try against North Queensland.

2015
On 25 March, Kennedy again re-signed with Canberra on a two-year contract.

2016
In September, Kennedy was named at second-row in the 2016 Intrust Super Premiership NSW Team of the Year.

2017
Kennedy was named in the Manly-Warringah squad for the 2017 NRL Auckland Nines.

He made his debut for Manly against South Sydney in round 2 of the 2017 NRL season.

References

External links
Manly Sea Eagles profile
Canberra Raiders profile
NRL profile

1989 births
Living people
Australian rugby league players
Canberra Raiders players
Manly Warringah Sea Eagles players
Mount Pritchard Mounties players
Rugby league centres
Rugby league players from New South Wales
Rugby league second-rows
Souths Logan Magpies players